Tampèlga may refer to:

Tampèlga, Tikare, Burkina Faso
Tampèlga, Zimtenga, Burkina Faso